Tomislav Sladojević Šola (born 1948) is a Croatian museologist.

Biography

Sladojević Šola was born in Zagreb, Croatia in 1948. He gained his diploma in Art History and English language (University of Zagreb, 1969-1974), he then pursued the post-graduate study of Journalism (Faculty of Political sciences, Zagreb, 1975–76) and two-semester-course of contemporary Museology (Sorbonne, Paris, 1978-1979) and made his PhD in Museology (University of Ljubljana, 1985).

Following a seven-year period of curatorships in Zagreb (1975-1981) and another seven years as Director of The Museum Documentation Centre (1981-1987), Šola joined the University of Zagreb and was appointed Assistant Professor in the Faculty of Humanities and Social Sciences, having retired in full professor tenure (1987-2013).

His academic research is closely linked to the profession and he draws on his practical experience as a curator, director, editor, lecturer and consultant.

Professor Tomislav Šola’s main research interests are in the practice of heritage and especially in examining its theoretical underpinnings, for which he coined the terms “Heritology“ (1982) and “Mnemosophy” (1987). Both describe the convergence of museum and heritage related occupations into one mega-profession based upon common science. The latter term as certain „cybernetic philosophy of heritage, addresses public memory issues and institutions in a more accurate way. His broad lecturing and publishing activity covered many other themes. Most of his books and writings are freely accessible online.

Professor Šola is the founder of The Best in Heritage, the world’s only annual survey of award-winning museum, heritage and conservation projects in Dubrovnik, (2002).

Bibliography 
(listed in the original language of each communication)
 
Scientific monographs and books 
 Antimuzej: bibliofilsko izdanje. Zagreb: Zbirka Biškupić, 1985.
 Role of museums in developing countries. Varanasi: Bharat Kala Bhavan Hindu University, 1989. p. 24.
 Essays On Museums And Their Theory: towards the cybernetic museum. Helsinki:  Finnish Museums Association, 1997. p. 293.
 Marketing u muzejima ili o vrlini i kako je obznaniti. Zagreb: Hrvatsko muzejsko društvo, 2001. Str. 322.
 Marketing u muzejima ili o vrlini i kako je obznaniti. Beograd: Clio, 2002. Str. 380.
 Eseji o muzejima i njihovoj teoriji-prema kibernetičkom muzeju. Zagreb: Hrvatski nacionalni komitet ICOM, 2003. Str. 350.
 De la vanitat a la saviesa / From Vanity to Wisdom // Institu Catala de Recercs en Patrimoni Cultural, Girona, 2009, pp. 1–71.
 Prema totalnom muzeju. Beograd, 2011, Centar za muzeologiju i heritologiju
 Eternity does not live here any more - a glossary of museum sins, Zagreb, 2012.
 Вечность здесь больше не живет: толковый словарь музейных грехов. — Тула: Музей-усадьба Л.Н.Толстого «Ясная Поляна», 2013. – 356 с.
 Javno pamćenje, čuvanje različitosti i mogući projekti. Zavod za Informacijske znanosti. Filozofski fakultet, Zagreb, 2014.
 Šola, Tomislav S. Mnemosophy. Essay on the science of public memory. EUB, Zagreb, 2015. 320 p.
 Шола Т.С. Мнемософия. Эссе о науке публичной памяти. /Пер. с англ. Синицыной О.В./. Ростов Великий ИКОМ России; ГМЗ «Ростовский кремль» 2017г. 320 с.
 Public memory in a deluded society: Notes of a lecturer, ICOFOM/ICOM, 2022

Chapters in books 
 The Museum Curator: endangered species. // Museums 2000 / ed. by  Patrick Boylan. London : Association Routledge, 1990. pp. 152–164.
 Museums and Curatorship: the role of theory // The Museum Profession/ ed. by Gaynor Kavanagh. Leicester : Leicester University Press,1991. pp. 125–137.
 The European Dream and Reality of Museums: a report from South-East. // Museums and Europe 1992 / ed. by Susan Pearce. London : The Athlone Press, 1992. pp. 159–173.
 Museums, museology, and ethics: a changing paradigm// Museum Ethics/ ed. by Gary Edson. London: Routledge, 1997.  pp. 168–175.
 The role of Museums in Sustaining Cultural Diversity // Cultural Traditions in Northern Ireland: cultural diversity in contemporary Europe./ ed. by maurna Crozier and Richard Froggat. Belfast: The Institute of Irish Studies, 1997. pp. 107–113
 Redefining collecting // Museums and the future of Collecting (Second Edition) / ed. by Simon J. Knell. Ashgate Publishing Limited: Aldershot. 2004. pp. 250–260.
 The importance of being wise or could "Museum archaeology" help us be better professionals // Archeologia del museo / Lenzi, Fiamma ; Zifferero, Andrea (ed.). Bologna : Editrice Compositori, 2004. pp. 11–16.
 Baština kao poziv i društveno opredjeljenje // Ivi Maroeviću baštinici u spomen / Vujić, Žarka ; Špikić, Marko (ed.), Zagreb : Zavod za informacijske studije Odsjeka za informacijske znanosti Filozofskog fakulteta Sveučilišta u Zagrebu, 2009. Str. 111-138.
 Towards the Total Museum/ Museums in a Digital Age / Parry, Ross (ed.)London : Routledge, 2009. pp. 421–426.
 The Museum Definition: Questioning the Scope and Motives // What is a museum? / Davis, A ; Mairesse, F ; Desvallees, A. (ed.). Muenchen : Verlag Dr. C.Mueller-Straten, 2010. pp. 106–112.
 European Collection Resources - museums serving European identity // Encouraging Collections Mobility - A way forward for museums in Europe / Pettersson, Susanna (ur.) Helsinki, Finska : Finnish National Gallery, 2010. pp. 248–257.
 Virtues and Qualities - a contribution to professionalizing the heritage profession // The Best in Heritage / Šola, Tomislav (ed.) Zagreb : European Heritage Association, 2011. pp. 10–21.
 Uloga baštinskih institucija u građenju nacionalnog identiteta // Hrvatski identitet / Horvat, Romana (ed.). Zagreb : Matica hrvatska, 2011. Str. 255-285.
 The heritage product as suggested by a marketing approach // Sketches and essays to mark twenty years of the International Cultural Centre / Purchla, Jacek (ed.). Kraków : International Cultural Centre, 2011. pp. 460–470.

References

External links

 Mnemosophy - Tomislav Šola's Blog
 The Best in Heritage official Website
 DUGi Media - Tomislav Šola
 The Future of Museums and the Role of Museology
 A Contribution to Understanding of Museums: Why Would the Museums Count?
 Heritology

Museologists
Academic staff of the University of Zagreb
Scientists from Zagreb
Living people
1948 births
University of Ljubljana alumni